Port Broughton railway line was an isolated  narrow gauge railway line serving Port Broughton on Spencer Gulf in South Australia. It opened in 1876 and closed in 1942.

The railway was built to service the port of Port Broughton, and opened on 11 March 1876. Horses were used to tow the empty wagons uphill, but they were sent downhill powered by gravity, with a driver to operate the brakes. The passenger service ceased on 17 September 1925. The use of the line for grain traffic continued until 1942.

In 1906, Clarence Goode, a member for Stanley in the House of Assembly, proposed the use of steam or petrol-powered locomotives on the line.

During January 1926, a Fordson rail tractor displaced the animal power. From 1931, the railways contracted out the service to a private operator. The railway ceased to be used on 3 August 1942, but the tractor continued to shunt wheat wagons between the station yard and the jetty at Port Broughton until 1949.

References

Closed railway lines in South Australia
Railway lines opened in 1876
Railway lines closed in 1942
3 ft 6 in gauge railways